The Cartersville Subdivision is a railroad line owned by CSX Transportation in the U.S. State of Georgia. At its east end it continues west from the W&A Subdivision and at its west end the track comes to an end.

See also
 List of CSX Transportation lines

References

CSX Transportation lines